Arrernte (also spelt Aranda, etc.) is a descriptor related to a group of Aboriginal Australian peoples from Central Australia. 

It may refer to:
 Arrernte (area), land controlled by the Arrernte Council (?)
 Arrernte people, Aboriginal Australians who speak Arrernte language
 Arrernte language, a dialect cluster spoken in the southern Northern Territory and some adjoining states, and includes:
Central Arrernte/Eastern Arrernte, spoken around Alice Springs
Western Arrernte
Lower Arrernte, also known as Lower Southern Arrernte
Southern Arrernte

Language and nationality disambiguation pages